Pushing Hands is a 1991 comedy-drama film directed by Taiwanese filmmaker Ang Lee, his feature directorial debut. It stars Sihung Lung as a Chinese Tai Chi master living in New York, who struggles to find his place in the world. The film shows the contrast between traditional Chinese ideas of Confucian relationships within a family and the much more informal Western emphasis on the individual. Together with Ang Lee's two following films, The Wedding Banquet (1993) and Eat Drink Man Woman (1994), it forms his "Father Knows Best" trilogy, each of which deals with conflicts between an older and more traditional generation and their children as they confront a world of change.

The Taiwanese-American co-production was produced independently by Lee and Ted Hope, and features several of Lee's frequent collaborators, including screenwriter James Schamus and editor Tim Squyres. It was released theatrically in Taiwan, but did not see a wide release in the United States for several years, after the success of The Wedding Banquet and Eat Drink Man Woman. It was critically well-received, and earned several accolades, including three Golden Horse Awards.

Plot

Chu is an elderly Chinese Tai Chi teacher who has recently emigrated from Beijing to New York City to live with his son, Alex, and his family. Chu finds life in America difficult and alienating, he doesn't speak English and his American daughter-in-law Martha doesn't speak Mandarin, making mutual comprehension and communication nearly impossible, with the bilingual Alex forced to act as interpreter. Martha, meanwhile, finds Chu increasingly insufferable, his noisy and obscure daily routine distracting her from writing her second novel. Every Sunday, Chu teaches tai chi classes at the local Chinese cultural center. During one such class, he meets Mrs. Chen, a cooking teacher and fellow expatriate from Beijing. The two begin to bond over their shared background and similar stations in life.

Tensions between Chu and Martha escalate during an attempt by him to cure her stomach cramp using chi inadvertently causes internal bleeding and forces her to be briefly hospitalized. Martha tells her husband that she can't stand being Chu's de facto caregiver, and tries to convince them to take her mother's offer to buy them a larger house so Chu and her don't have to share a space. Alex explains that he feels obligated to take care of his father in the tradition of Confucian familial relations, where a child will take care of a parent when they grow old as they once took care of them.

One night while Alex is out, Chu goes on a walk against Martha's wishes. When he doesn't return home before Alex does, the son assumes he's lost and goes looking for him. When he can't find him, he suffers a nervous breakdown, blaming Martha and trashing his kitchen before leaving. Chu eventually returns home without incident, and despite his and Martha's inability to understand each other, they manage to communicate and clean up the mess in the kitchen. Alex returns home hours later, intoxicated, and attempts to smash his head into the bathroom wall before ranting to Jeremy about how neither Chu nor Martha care about him. After Alex sobers up, he resolves to Martha to send his father to a retirement home, but when he goes to tell his father, he finds him emotionally distraught over a photograph of his wife. Chu admits that during the Cultural Revolution, a roving group of Red Guards attacked his family instead of him because he was a T'ai chi ch'uan master and they feared challenging him. Chu protected Alex but his wife was fatally injured, and he blames himself for her death.

The Chu and Chen families go on a picnic. The groups go hiking, but the elderly lag behind. Chen then has a breakdown and admits to the Chu that her daughter does not want her to be around anymore, that she overheard the two parties talking about setting their parents up together so they would leave their families. Realizing his son can't live with him, Chu moves out in the middle of the night, leaving behind a note telling his son he intends to spend the rest of his life alone practicing self-discipline.

Chu moves to a small apartment in Chinatown and finds employment at a restaurant as a dishwasher, but is quickly chastised for his age and slow work rate. Eventually, the restaurant owner attempts to fire him, but Chu refuses to leave and challenges the owner to move him half a step. The owner attempts to do so, but quickly realizes that Chu is a tai chi master and can't be moved easily. He orders the rest of his staff to move him, but they are unable to despite their hardest efforts. Already disgusted by the owner's callous treatment of the elderly Chu, they all quit in protest. The owner proceeds to summon a band of local thugs to try and remove Chu, but he easily fends them all off. It takes a small army of police officers several hours to finally remove Chu and take him into custody.

Alex sees the story of his father's arrest on the news, and he rushes to the precinct where he's being held to bring him home. Chu steadfastly refuses to live with his son because he doesn't want to be a burden, and Alex emotionally admits that all these years he tried to earn enough money to bring his father to the United States so he could finally have the happy life he was always denied in China.

Sometime later, Alex, Martha, and Jeremy have purchased the larger house and moved in, with Alex believing that his father will come to visit so he can see his grandson. Alex, who up until now has displayed ignorance of his father's martial arts, demonstrates a pushing hands technique to his wife. Meanwhile, the elderly Chu teaches a tai chi class in Chinatown, where Mrs. Chen comes to visit him. She tells him that his fending off the thugs and police have made him a local hero, and people come from all over the city to attend his classes. She tells him that she's moved out and is living alone in an apartment across the street from him. She leaves, but Chu follows her and asks her if she's doing anything that afternoon. She replies no.

Cast 

Sihung Lung as Mr. Chu (C: 朱老, P: Zhū-lǎo), a T'ai chi ch'uan master who travels to the United States.
 Bo Z. Wang as Alex Chu (T: 朱曉生, S: 朱晓生, P: Zhū Xiǎoshēng), Chu's son, he acts as an interpreter between Mr. Chu and Martha, but he deliberately mistranslates to reduce tensions between the two parties. 
 Deb Snyder as Martha Chu (T: 瑪莎, S: 玛莎, P: Mǎshā), Alex's European American wife. Martha, who does not speak or understand Chinese.
 Wang Lai as Mrs. Chen (T: 陳太太, S: 陈太太, P: Chén-tàitai), a widow who is a cooking instructor at the area Chinese community center.
Haan Lee as Jeremy Chu (C: 吉米, P: Jímǐ), Alex and Martha's son.
 Fanny De Luz as Linda (T: 琳達, C: 琳达, P: Líndá), Martha's friend.
Hung-Chang Wang as Boss Huang, the owner of a Chinatown restaurant where Chu ends up working.
Emily Yi-Ming Liu as Chen Yi-quan, Mrs. Chen's adult daughter.

Title
The title of the film refers to the [pushing hands] training that is part of the grandfather's t'ai chi routine. Pushing hands is a two-person training which teaches Taiji students to yield in the face of brute force. Tai Chi teachers were persecuted in China during the Cultural Revolution, and the grandfather's family was broken up as a result. He sent his son to the West several years earlier and when he could he came to live with his family with the expectation of picking up where they left off, but he was unprepared for the very different atmosphere of the West. "Pushing Hands" thereby alludes to the process of adaptation to culture shock felt by a traditional teacher in moving to the United States.

Production

Development 
Taiwanese-born filmmaker Ang Lee had graduated from New York University Tisch School of the Arts in 1984, but had failed to find career opportunities since, working almost full-time as a house-father. During the intermediate six years, he became interested in martial arts, specifically tai chi, after reading the wuxia novel Jianghu qixia zhuan (The Story of an Extraordinary Gallant Errant). Lee first developed the idea of a film about an old man and old woman falling in love in front of their children, but did not start writing the script until he learned of a script competition being held by the Government Information Office of Taiwan. Lee began writing in February 1990, while practicing tai chi at a nearby community college. At the end of March, the script for Pushing Hands was submitted along with the one for The Wedding Banquet, which he had already written. His scripts came in first and second, respectively.

The winning screenplays brought Lee to the attention of Hsu Li-kong, a recently promoted senior manager in a major studio who had a strong interest in Lee's unique style and freshness. Hsu, a first-time producer, invited Lee to direct Pushing Hands. The film was financed by the Taiwanese production company Central Motion Pictures, who also handled the film's domestic release. Lee hired Ted Hope and James Schamus of Good Machine to act as the U.S. production coordinator. Due to concerns about the international market and the American character, Ang asked Schamus to help rewrite the script.

Casting 
The leading role of Mr. Chu was played by Sihung Lung, a veteran Taiwanese film, TV, and stage actor. At the time of his casting, he had already retired from acting, but enjoyed the script so much he came out of retirement to star in it. He would become one of Lee's frequent collaborators, subsequently starring in The Wedding Banquet, Eat Drink Man Woman (where he also played a character named Chu), and Crouching Tiger, Hidden Dragon.

Filming 
Good Machine initially estimated that the filming period of the film would be three weeks, but under Lee's insistence, Schamus and Hope changed the shooting period to four weeks. Before filming began, the crew spent two weeks setting and rehearsing. On the day of the shooting, the crew set up a table and incense, and held a gong ceremony, a practice Lee would continue into his future projects.

The film was shot entirely on-location in New York City, making it the first Taiwanese film to be shot entirely in the United States. The Chu residence was a house located in the North Riverdale sub-neighborhood of The Bronx. Ang requested that the house have very large windows in order to photograph the interior from the outside. Because the house didn't have any furniture, the crew transported furniture from Manhattan, but Ang was not satisfied. Ang moved his own furniture onto the set, which was later destroyed in the scene where Alex trashes the kitchen. Some of the paintings used as props in the house were donated to the production by Ang's artist friend. During production, one such painting was stolen.

The scenes set in the jail were filmed at a detention center in Yonkers. During the filming process, many overseas Chinese students studying in the United States enthusiastically assisted the crew.

Reception 
The film was critically acclaimed in both Taiwan and the United States. Donald Lyons wrote that Lee's filming style displayed "a mastery of the visual dynamics of interior spaces and their psychic pressures."

Accolades

See also 

 The Wedding Banquet
 Eat Drink Man Woman

References

External links

Further reading
 Dariotis, Wei Ming and Eileen Fung. "Breaking the Soy Sauce Jar: Diaspora and Displacement in the Films of Ang Lee." in: Lu, Sheldon Hsiao-peng (Xiaopeng) (editor). Transnational Chinese Cinemas: Identity, Nationhood, Gender. University of Hawaii Press, January 1, 1997. , 9780824818456.

1992 films
1991 drama films
1991 films
Central Motion Picture Corporation films
Films about Chinese Americans
English-language Taiwanese films
Films about immigration to the United States
Films directed by Ang Lee
Films set in the United States
Films shot in New York City
Films set in New York City
Films with screenplays by Ang Lee
Films with screenplays by James Schamus
1990s Mandarin-language films
Taiwanese drama films
Films about Taiwanese Americans
Tai chi films
1992 directorial debut films
1992 drama films
Taiwanese martial arts films
American martial arts films
Chinese-language American films
1990s English-language films
1990s multilingual films
Taiwanese multilingual films
American multilingual films
1990s American films